Government College of Technology, Coimbatore (GCT) is an autonomous state-funded engineering college located in Coimbatore, Tamil Nadu, India. It is affiliated to Anna University.

History
Government College of Technology, Coimbatore was founded in 1945 as Arthur Hope College of Technology named after Arthur Hope, Governor of Madras Presidency (1940–46) by G. D. Naidu. The College was modelled after the then famous Germany’s technical institutions with inputs by Stoll family and Hermann Weiler. Till 1950 the college functioned in Peelamedu, then a suburb of Coimbatore.

In June 1950, the college moved to its current location in Thadagam Road, Coimbatore. In 1951, the college was renamed as Government College of Technology (GCT). The college was initially affiliated to the University of Madras, later to the Bharathiar University and since the academic year 2001-2002 to Anna University. In 1981, the college was granted autonomy for its civil and mechanical engineering postgraduate programs. Subsequently, in 1987, full autonomy for all programs was granted.

Academics
The institute offers undergraduate courses leading to the degree of Bachelor of Engineering and postgraduate courses award the Master of Engineering degree. The Institution affiliated to Anna University, Chennai offers 9 Full-Time Under Graduate programmes, 4 Part-Time Under Graduate programmes and 11 Post Graduate programmes. The Institution has been exercising academic autonomy since 1987. All the Departments are recognized as center’s for research by Anna University. 7 Under Graduate Programmes and 3 Post Graduate Programmes are accredited by the National Board of Accreditation. Undergraduate students are admitted based on competitive student rankings in higher secondary examination.

Under Graduate Programmes 
GCT, Coimbatore offers 9 Under Graduate ( UG) Courses 4 of which are also available as part-time courses. Candidates are selected in the undergraduate programme on the basis of the TNEA score. Admission to all the undergraduate programme is done through the single window system of Anna University. The courses provided are listed below,

Full Time Courses 

 Civil Engineering
 Mechanical Engineering
 Electrical and Electronics Engineering (EEE)
 Electronics and Communication Engineering (ECE)
 Production Engineering
 Electronics and Instrumentation Engineering (EIE)
 Computer Science and Engineering (CSE)
 Information Technology (IT)
 Industrial BioTechnology (IBT)

Part Time Courses 

 Civil Engineering
 Mechanical Engineering
 Electrical and Electronics Engineering (EEE)
 Electronics and Communication Engineering (ECE)

Post Graduate Programmes 
The Institute provides Full-time Post Graduate (PG) Courses under various specializations. Candidates are selected in the ME/ MTech programme on the basis of TANCET/GATE score. Candidates are selected in the postgraduate programme through Anna University Single Window System.  Candidate must have a valid TANCET/GATE score to get eligible for the programme. The Post Graduate courses are listed below,

 Structural Engineering
 Environmental Engineering
 Geotechnical Engineering
 Engineering Design
 Manufacturing Engineering
 Thermal Engineering
 Power Systems Engineering
 Power Electronics and Drives
 Applied Electronics
 VLSI design
 Computer Science and Engineering

The institute also provides M.S (By research) and Doctoral programmes.

Student life

Clubs
The various forums and clubs include Society of Automotive Engineers (SAE-GCT Collegiate Club), GCT-Motorsports, Mechanical Engineering Association, Biotech Forum, Civil Engineering Association, Computer Science and Engineering Association (CSEA), Information Technology Association (ITA), Electrical, Electronics and Instrumentation Engineering Association (EEEIEA), Electronics and Communication Engineering Association (ECEA), Production Engineering Association (PEA), Student Branch of IEEE, ISTE chapter, Administration Aspirants Council(AAC), Rotaract club, Green club, Science club, Y's club, Fine arts club, MuFX GCT(Orchestra), Literary and Debating Society, Tamil Mandram. Student Journalist Council-GCT is the official media body of the GCT. The first edition of Aperture, the student e-Newsletter of GCT was launched on 21 February 2014. The Rotaract club of GCT earned the "Well-balanced Club" award at the Rotaract District Assembly 2017. 'Eliminators' is the official dance team of GCT. The Administration Aspirants Council (AAC) is a council for developing the UPSC Civil Services Aspirants among the GCT students. It has set up an own Library called AAC LIBRARY within the college campus with the permission of the respected Principal and with the funds provided by the GCT Alumni Association (GCTAA). AAC Library is opened for 24 hours and students conduct early morning and late-night classes among themselves and have interviewed many bureaucrats of our nation in their official Youtube channel.

Hostels

There are 10 Hostel blocks available for both men and women in which 1500 students can accommodate. Boys Hostel names are Paalaaru, Ponnaiyaaru, Kauvery, Bhavani, Vaigai, Thamiraparani and Vellaru. Girls Hostel names are Kothaiyaaru, Manimuthaaru and Amaravathi

Rankings

Government College of Technology, Coimbatore was ranked 160 among engineering colleges by the National Institutional Ranking Framework (NIRF) in 2022.

Notable alumni
 Mylswamy Annadurai, Former Director ISRO Satellite Centre, Padma Shri Awardee.
 B. Codanayaguy, Indian Rocket Scientist, Nari Shakti Puraskar Awardee.
 N. Valarmathi, Scientist, project director of RISAT-1, and the first person to receive Abdul Kalam Award.
 Thamarai, poet, lyricist, writer and journalist
 S. Ramakrishnan, Founder president of Amar Seva Sangam, Padma Shri Awardee.
 Padmanaban Gopalan, Indian social entrepreneur and founder of No Food Waste (NFW).
 Nagasubramanian Chokkanathan, Tamil writer and Novelist.
Vijay Anand (politician), Anti-Corruption activist.
Satish Dharmaraj, Managing Director at Redpoint Ventures, American entrepreneur, speaker, angel investor and venture capitalist.
Swami Manohar, First Recipient of Dewang Mehta Award for innovation in IT, Co-Founder Picopeta Simputers, Strand, Limberlink Tech and Escape Velocity Accelerator
V. C. Kulandaiswamy Indian Academic, Author, Padma Shri and Padma Bhushan awardee.

See also
 List of Tamil Nadu Government's Educational Institutions
 List of Tamil Nadu Government's Engineering Colleges

References

External links

GCT Website 

Colleges affiliated to Anna University
Engineering colleges in Coimbatore
Academic institutions formerly affiliated with the University of Madras